John Wirth may refer to:

 John Wirth (historian) (1936–2002), professor of Latin American studies
 John Wirth (television producer), television showrunner, producer, and writer
 John L. Wirth (1917–1945), United States Navy officer